Zleep Hotels is a chain of budget hotels based in Copenhagen, Denmark. It was founded in 2003 and is today owned by Peter Haaber. The chain consists of nine three-starred hotels of which six are located in the Greater Copenhagen area and three in Jutland.

History
Zleep Hotels was founded in 2003 by Peter Haaber, Knud Larsen and former HORESTA chairman Egon Klitgaard via the company Nordic Hotel Management. The three partners knew each other from Scandic Hotels. The company was initially headquartered in the same building as its first hotel in Kastrup but moved to larger premises in Avedøre in 2003. Peter Haaber later acquired full ownership of the company (when?). Zleep Hotels became a member of the European Hotelstars Union in 2017.

Hotels
As of January 2019, Zleep Hotels comprised the following hotels:
 Zleep Hotel Ballerup
 Zleep Hotel Billund
 Zleep Hotel Copenhagen Airport (Kastrup)
 Zleep Hotel Copenhagen City (Vesterbro)
 Zleep Hotel Kalundborg
 Zleep Hotel Kolding
 Zleep Hotel Ishøj
 Zleep Hotel Roskilde (prev. Hotel Prindsen)
 Zleep Hotel Aarhus South (prev. Hotel Mercur)
 Zleep Hotel Aalborg
 Zleep Hotel Upplands Väsby, Stockholm
 Zleep Hotel Aarhus North (open July 2019)
 Zleep Hotel Lyngby (2020)
 Zleep Hotel Hillerød (2020)
 Zleep Hotel Copenhagen Arena (2020)

Future hotel openings
Zleep Hotels is involved in four hotel projects that are expected to open in 2019 and 2020:
 Zleep Hotel Aarhus North (Opens with 100 rooms in July 2019)
 Zleep Hotel Copenhagen Arena (198 rooms) will be located near Royal Arena in the Ørestad district of Copenhagen.
 Zleep Hotel Lyngby (112 rooms)
 Zleep Hotel Hillerød (95 rooms)
 Zleep Hotel Hamburg Altonaer Volkspark (Opens with 204 rooms in 2022)

Core Hospitality
Core Hospitality, a sister company of Zleep Hotels, was established as a Nordic white label (Brand independent) hotel operator in 2017. It will be the operator of the first Moxy Hotel in Copenhagen which will open in the city's South Harbour district in 2018.

See also

References

External links
 Official website

Hospitality companies of Denmark
Hotel and leisure companies based in Copenhagen
Hotel chains in Denmark
Danish companies established in 2003
Companies based in Høje-Taastrup Municipality